La famille Plouffe was a Canadian television drama, more specifically a téléroman, about a Quebec City family that first aired in the French language on Société Radio-Canada in 1953. The show was created to fill a void in francophone television in Canada. Whereas the English Canadian television branch of the Canadian Broadcasting Corporation could broadcast English-language shows from American stations, the francophone component of the CBC, Radio-Canada had to develop its own programs for French Canadian viewers from the earliest days of television in Canada.  This show was one of the few that helped to launch the téléroman genre of programming in French Canada, around the same time the first telenovelas aired in Latin America.

The series was also broadcast live in English as The Plouffe Family on CBC Television the following year and ran on both networks until 1959. The series was revived in the 1980s as a miniseries.

The series was based on the novel Les Plouffe, by Roger Lemelin. It chronicled the daily life of a working-class family in the years following World War II. The family included patriarch Théophile, a former provincial cycling champion who had settled into life as a plumber, his wife Joséphine, a naive but kind-hearted mother who doted on her adult children Napoléon, Ovide, Cécile and Guillaume.

It was designated and preserved as a "masterwork" by the Audio-Visual Preservation Trust of Canada, a charitable non-profit organization dedicated to promoting the preservation of Canada’s audio-visual heritage.

Cast

 Théophile Plouffe – Paul Guèvremont
 Joséphine Plouffe – Amanda Alarie
 Napoléon Plouffe – Émile Genest
 Ovide Plouffe – Jean-Louis Roux, Marcel Houben
 Guillaume Plouffe – Pierre Valcour
 Cécile Plouffe – Denise Pelletier
 Gédéon Plouffe – Doris Lussier
 Démérise Plouffe – Nana de Varennes
 Onéisme Ménard – Rolland Bédard
 Rita Toulouse – Lise Roy, Jeannine Mignolet
 Blanche Toulouse – Lucie Poitras
 Jeanne Labrie – Thérèse Cadorette
 Stan Labrie – Jean Duceppe
 Père Alexandre – Guy Provost
 Martine Plouffe – Margot Campbell
 Aimé Plouffe – Jean Coutu
 Flora Plouffe – Ginette Letondal
 Agathe Plouffe – Clémence DesRochers
 Rosaire Joyeux – Camille Ducharme
 Jacqueline Sévigny – Amulette Garneau
 Alain Richard – Guy Godin
 Hélène Giguère – Françoise Graton
 Alphonse Tremblay – Ernest Guimond

References

External links

The Family Plouffe/La Famille Plouffe, Museum of Broadcast Communications
The Plouffe Family aka La Famille Plouffe - Canadian Communication Foundation

Ici Radio-Canada Télé original programming
1953 Canadian television series debuts
Téléromans
Television shows set in Quebec City
Television shows filmed in Quebec City
1950s Canadian comedy-drama television series
1959 Canadian television series endings
Black-and-white Canadian television shows